John Declan Mulligan (April 4, 1938 – November 2, 2021) was an Irish-born American rock musician, singer and songwriter, best known as a guitarist of rock band The Beau Brummels in the 1960s.

Life and career
Mulligan was born in Fethard, County Tipperary.   He emigrated to Toronto, before moving to San Francisco in 1962.  In early 1964, he met Ron Elliott, Sal Valentino, and John Petersen during an informal rehearsal at the Irish Cultural Center in San Francisco. 
After joining the Beau Brummels, who shortly thereafter also added Ron Meagher, Mulligan recorded perhaps his most memorable contribution with the band, the harmonica opening of the hit single "Laugh, Laugh," 
which reached the top 20 of the U.S. Billboard Hot 100 in February 1965.

He appeared with the band in the 1965 science-fiction/comedy movie Village of the Giants, which was featured in a 1994 episode of Mystery Science Theater 3000. He sings "Woman" in the film, a song written by Elliott, which ultimately appeared as an instrumental on the band's second album, with Mulligan's vocal being replaced by a lead guitar track. Mulligan also appears with the group in their one other movie appearance, "Wild Wild Winter", in which he delivers the band's only line of dialog. 
By the middle of 1965, Mulligan was no longer a member of the band. 
In 1966, he sued the band for $1.25 million in damages, claiming he was wrongfully dismissed from the group. 

He later played in a local band "The Black Velvet Band", which in the early 1970s also included Meagher. He reunited with the Beau Brummels for a 1975 reunion album. After the original group broke up after its 1975 tour, Mulligan formed his own band, Mulligan Stew, which eventually fostered a revival of The Beau Brummels. At different times, the reformed band also included Ron Elliott, Sal Valentino and Ron Meagher. 

In 1981, Mulligan and Elliott, along with new members, vocalist-bassist John Hjort (aka Jackson Hart), drummer Peter Tucker, and keyboardist James Moyles, released an independent single, "Back To Life" b/w "Native Son", a session produced by Vince Welnick of The Tubes and The Grateful Dead. Welnick also added keyboards and harmony vocals to the session. The recording failed to garner any substantial attention.

Mulligan died in November 2021, at the age of 83.

Discography
With The Beau Brummels
 Introducing the Beau Brummels (1965)
 The Beau Brummels, Vol. 2 (1965)
 The Beau Brummels (1975)

References

External links
 
 

1938 births
2021 deaths
Irish rock musicians
The Beau Brummels members
Musicians from County Tipperary